Bontecou Lake, also known as Tamarack Swamp, is a shallow, man-made bifurcation lake in the towns of Stanford and Washington, in Dutchess County, New York, less than  from the Village of Millbrook. Bontecou Lake straddles the drainage divide between the Wappinger Creek watershed to the west and the Tenmile River. Parts of the lake are designated as a Critical Environmental Area, since the area is a crucial habitat for both migrating and breeding waterfowl.

History and geography

Bontecou Lake is located on the property of Rally Farms, founded by Frederic H. Bontecou (who would later be elected a state senator) in 1926. As the farm became renowned for its Angus cattle herd, water demands increased. Around 1956, responding to severe drought, Bontecou worked with the Dutchess County Soil and Water Conservation District to construct two earthen dams, impounding an existing, 5-to- pool of water at the center of a forested wetland known as Tamarack Swamp. Noted for quality of fishing by the Poughkeepsie Journal in 1968, the lake experienced a severe fish die-off the next year. This was attributed to a harsh winter that killed aquatic plant life in the shallow reservoir, depleting water oxygen levels.

The lake, oblong in shape and oriented from northwest–southeast, is surrounded by woods and farmlands. It is bounded on the western end by Shuman Road.

Hydrology
Bontecou Lake straddles the drainage divide between the Wappinger Creek watershed to the west and the Tenmile River watershed to the east, and it is unclear precisely where in the lake the two drainage basins diverge. The western outflow is unofficially known as Tamarack Swamp Creek, and although its sub-watershed is the sixth largest out of sixteen within the Wappinger Creek catchment area, it only contributes around 2% among major tributaries to the Wappinger Creek's total flow. Among the 13 bodies of water larger than  partially or wholly within the Wappinger Creek watershed, Bontecou Lake is the only one that has not been assigned a New York State Department of Environmental Conservation (NYSDEC) water quality classification.

Wildlife and conservation
Bontecou Lake is an important wildlife habitat, and in 1987, the town of Stanford designated its portion of the lake, along with parts of the adjacent wetlands, as a Critical Environmental Area to protect the large numbers of migratory and breeding waterfowl that seek refuge there. The NYSDEC also monitors and regulates land usage in a  tract surrounding and including the lake, as directed by the New York State Freshwater Wetlands Act of 1975. 

One of the first breeding pairs of Canada geese in Dutchess County was recorded here in 1964; before that year, only one other nesting site had been observed in the county's history. Today, the lake and swamp are home to hundreds of Canada geese year-round, with many thousands using the area as a stop-over point during migration periods. The first cackling goose ever documented in the county was also spotted at Bontecou Lake in May 1977. Dead trees extending above the surface of the water quickly made this a preferred breeding ground for great blue herons, which continue to nest on the eastern side of the lake. Though only a handful of the trees remain standing, they provide nesting opportunities for several bird species, including the eastern bluebird, for which the partially submerged trees constitute a relatively rare natural breeding site away from buildings and free of competitors.

Though located entirely on private property, the lake is a popular destination for birders who have been granted permission to access the land, either individually or through birding club membership.

References

Lakes of Dutchess County, New York
Bifurcation lakes